Amal El Alami (Arabic أمل العلمي; born 9 July 1950) is a Moroccan physician, neurosurgeon and writer. He was born at Casablanca, the quartier Habous, in a nationalist family linked to the Istiqlal Party.

Family origins 
Amal el Alami comes from a famous family of Fez, Al Alami branch Idrisids. He is the son of poet, linguist and nationalist Idriss ibn al-Hassan al-Alami (1925–2007). He is the descendant of the doctor and astronomer    
(1830–1904).

Training and career 
 Bachelor's in experimental sciences (Lycée Moulay Abdallah Casablanca) – June 1969
 Course of study at the Faculty of Medicine and Pharmacy of Rabat Ibn Sina University Hospital (1969–1977)
 Internal CHU Ibn Rushd of Casablanca on competition (24 January 1977): in general surgery and then in pneumology (1977–1979)
 Defense of his doctoral thesis in medicine resulting in his MD degree, 17 March 1979, from the Mohammed V University at Souissi in Rabat where he held the post of assistant in ENT (hospital 20 August)
 Assistant (19 March 1979): in ENT then Neurosurgery (1979–1981)
 Lecturer in Neurosurgery (29 June 1981) (1982–1990)
 Resident alien of the Assistance Publique – Hôpitaux de Paris, in the service of Neurosurgery of Henri Mondor Hospital headed by Professor JP Caron (1982–1983)
 He has taught at various Moroccan university hospital: from Casablanca, from Rabat, and Fes.
 He participated in many conferences and scientific seminars in Morocco and abroad
 Resignation of University Hospital (23 April 1990), and professional practice in private practice in Fes to date.
 He has translated many medical texts of the English in French and in Arabic.

Certificates and diplomas 
 University Diploma of Microsurgery
 UD of Biochemistry of normal and pathological nervous system
 CES of Neuroanatomy
 CES of Neurophysiology Clinical Child
 Certificate of Scanner the head
 Certificate of Radiation Protection

Works 
 Islam and the medical culture – Modern Printing House Casablanca (in French), second edition 1983.
 The euthanasia (in Arabic) 1999 – Infoprint printing Fez
 Towards an Islamic Medicine (in Arabic) – 1999 – Printing Annajah al Jadida Casablanca (Legal Deposit No. 1999/1441)
 Testimonials of an operated by open heart surgery (in French), 2012 (in press)
 Encyclopedic Dictionary of Neurosurgery (in French)
 The miracle of the brain (of neurobiology to the religion ) (in Arabic)
 Abdeslam Al Alami (first doctor Moroccan 1836–1904): his life and works (in Arabic)
 The poet and linguist Idriss Bin Al Hassan Al Alami (1925–2007) (in Arabic)

Inventions 
 Framework biopsy spinal in stereotactic condition
 Goniometric frame of traction and reduction in the spine neck

References

External links 
 Monte Alem, the Arabic section :ar:جبل العلمجبل العلم

1950 births
Living people
People from Casablanca
Moroccan neurosurgeons